Lord Robert Renebald Pelham-Clinton (15 October 1820 – 25 July 1867), known as Lord Robert Clinton, was a British Liberal Party politician.

Background
Clinton was a younger son of Henry Pelham-Clinton, 4th Duke of Newcastle, and Georgiana Elizabeth, daughter of Edward Miller-Mundy. Henry Pelham-Clinton, 5th Duke of Newcastle and Lord Charles Pelham-Clinton were his elder brothers.

Political career
Clinton entered the House of Commons as Member of Parliament (MP) for Nottinghamshire North when he was elected unopposed at the 1852 general election.  He was re-elected unopposed at three further general elections, until he stood down at the 1865.

Personal life
In 1847 he volunteered his services gratuitously as an agent for the British Relief Association in Ireland. Pelham-Clinton died in July 1867, aged 46.

References

External links 
 

1820 births
1867 deaths
Younger sons of dukes
Liberal Party (UK) MPs for English constituencies
UK MPs 1852–1857
UK MPs 1857–1859
UK MPs 1859–1865
Robert